The 1986 Sam Houston State Bearkats football team represented Sam Houston State University as a member of the Gulf Star Conference (GSC) during the 1986 NCAA Division I-AA football season. Led by fifth-year head coach Ron Randleman, the Bearkats compiled an overall record of 9–3 with a mark of 3–1 in conference play, and finished as champion in the GSC. Sam Houston State advanced to the NCAA Division I-AA Football Championship playoffs, where they were defeated by Arkansas State in the first round.

Schedule

References

Sam Houston State
Sam Houston Bearkats football seasons
Sam Houston State Bearkats football